Amos Madden Thayer (October 10, 1841 – April 24, 1905) was a United States circuit judge of the United States Court of Appeals for the Eighth Circuit and of the United States Circuit Courts for the Eighth Circuit and previously was a United States district judge of the United States District Court for the Eastern District of Missouri.

Education and career

Born in Mina, New York, Thayer graduated from Hamilton College in 1862 and then joined the United States Army, serving as a major from 1862 to 1865. He read law in 1868 and went into private practice in the Montana Territory, then in St. Louis, Missouri. He became a Judge of the Circuit Courts of Missouri for the St. Louis Circuit from 1876 to 1887.

Federal judicial service

Thayer was nominated by President Grover Cleveland on February 21, 1887, to a seat on the United States District Court for the Eastern District of Missouri vacated by Judge Samuel Treat. He was confirmed by the United States Senate on February 26, 1887, and received his commission the same day. His service terminated on August 20, 1894, due to his elevation to the Eighth Circuit.

Thayer was nominated by President Cleveland on August 6, 1894, to the United States Court of Appeals for the Eighth Circuit and the United States Circuit Courts for the Eighth Circuit, to a new joint seat authorized by 28 Stat. 115. He was confirmed by the Senate on August 9, 1894, and received his commission the same day. His service terminated on April 24, 1905, due to his death in St. Louis.

Other service

Concurrent with his federal judicial service, Thayer was a professor at Washington University in St. Louis, starting in 1890.

References

Sources
 

1841 births
1905 deaths
Hamilton College (New York) alumni
Missouri state court judges
Judges of the United States District Court for the Eastern District of Missouri
Judges of the United States Court of Appeals for the Eighth Circuit
United States federal judges appointed by Grover Cleveland
19th-century American judges
Washington University in St. Louis faculty
United States Army officers
United States federal judges admitted to the practice of law by reading law